Science Noodles are a brand of instant noodle that is marketed in Taiwan by the Uni-President Enterprises Corporation. Unlike normal instant noodles, they are usually eaten without cooking the noodles. Instead, the bag is crushed with the ramen noodles inside, and seasoning added using the included spices. In fact, the real popularity of Science Noodles lies in this method of consumption, as it is eaten like a snack food. Because of this, most packaging no longer contains instructions for cooking the noodles.

History

Science Noodles entered the market in 1970, known as the brand "Taiwan Instant Noodles." In the 1970s Taiwan market lacked many consumer goods, so children's snacks were rare. However, at the time a pack of Science Noodles was only 2.5 NT$, which created demand as a children's snack.

By the mid-1980s, Science Noodles began to compete with the more favored instant noodle brand, Prince Noodles. Despite the competition between the two, Taiwanese consumers tended to purchase the former due to its larger portion compared with the latter.

See also
 
 List of instant noodle brands
 List of noodles

References

External links

Taiwanese brands
Instant noodle brands